Catch the Catch is the debut album by pop singer C. C. Catch, released on April 28, 1986. The album consists of Euro disco and synthpop songs. It includes the major top 10 European pop hits "I Can Lose My Heart Tonight", "'Cause You Are Young" and "Strangers by Night".

Track listings

Charts

Weekly charts

Year-end charts

Credits
Arranged by, music by, lyrics by, produced by – Dieter Bohlen 
Art direction [art direction & concept], artwork [front cover] – M. Vormstein 
Artwork [back cover] – Herbert W. Hesselmann 
Design – Ariola-Studios

References

C. C. Catch albums
1986 debut albums
Hansa Records albums